A Neo-classical contract is a form of contract, defined by McNeil, describing a contract dependent upon trilateral governance, in which "third party assistance" is used  for resolving disputes or evaluating performance. Such contracts form a distinct group, along with classical and relational contracts, in McNeil's system of classification.

References

Contract law